Tefala (Ile Tevala, Téfala, Île Tévala) is a small uninhabited island in the Pacific Ocean, belonging to the Shefa Province of Vanuatu.

Geography
The island lies 2.6 km north-west of the small island of Laika, 9.4 km north of the island of Tongoa, and east of Epi.

Geology
Tefala and other small islands scattered around Tongoa (Laika, Sail Rock) were once a part of a larger landmass formed by the eruptions of the submarine volcano of Kuwae in the second half of the 15th century. The volcanic arc, called the New Hebrides arc, is home to a number of more famous volcanoes, such as Yasur, Gaua, and Ambrym.

References

Islands of Vanuatu
Shefa Province
Uninhabited islands of Vanuatu